Cantonian High School is an English-medium 11-18 community school maintained by Cardiff local authority. It is located in Fairwater and serves the surrounding area in the west of Cardiff, Wales. There are currently more than 1000 pupils on roll and the school is continually growing. Although in the past it has often struggled, it has progressed significantly in recent years, and performed well in its most recent Estyn inspections, earning the title Cardiff's most improved school in Wales Online.

History 
The school opened in Market Road, Cardiff, in 1907 as Canton Municipal Secondary School and was renamed as Canton High School in 1933. The school admitted boys and girls, but the school was bombed in 1941 and the girls school moved to Llanover Hall. The boys and girls schools merged and moved to a new site in Fairview in 1962 and took the name Cantonian High School when they became a comprehensive in 1970. The original building became the Chapter Arts Centre in 1971.

Future plans 
Cardiff Council is planning to completely rebuild Cantonian High School, to expand the Sixth Form capacity, and to provide a Specialist Resource Base for people with ASD.

Notable people
David Blanchflower
Richard Fenwick, bishop
Justin Kerrigan 
Joe Ledley, Wales footballer
Danielle Lineker, Welsh model and celebrity

References

External links 
2005 Estyn Inspection Report
2011 Estyn Inspection Report
2015 Estyn Inspection Report
2017 Estyn Monitoring Report
2019 Estyn Inspection Report

Secondary schools in Cardiff
Educational institutions established in 1907
1907 establishments in Wales